Tricia Derges is an American politician. She served as a Republican member for the 140th district of the Missouri House of Representatives.

Born in Giddings, Texas. Derges attended at the Kirkwood High School. In 2021, she won the election for the 140th district of the Missouri House of Representatives. Derges succeeded politician, Lynn Morris. In 2022, she was resigned from her 140th district office for which Derges was considered guilty after being convicted on federal corruption charges.

References 

Living people
Place of birth missing (living people)
Year of birth missing (living people)
People from Giddings, Texas
Republican Party members of the Missouri House of Representatives
21st-century American politicians
21st-century American women politicians
20th-century American women